The 2013–14 V Football Group season was the 64th season of the Bulgarian V Group. The group comprises the third level of the Bulgarian football pyramid and is divided into four geographic regions: North-West, North-East, South-East, and South-West.

The top team from each region was directly promoted to B Group for season 2014–15. The bottom two teams of each division were relegated to their respective regional groups at the fourth level of the football league system for the following season.

Changes from season 2012–13

Club Movements Between V Group and B Group
The champions of the four 2012–13 V AFG divisions were promoted to the 2013–14 B PFG: Dobrudzha Dobrich from V AFG North-East and Botev Galabovo from V AFG South-East, Akademik Svishtov from V AFG North-West and Marek 2010 Dupnitsa from V AFG South-West.

In return, Sliven 2000 was expelled from B PFG championship in March 2013. Other teams, which relegated to V AFG, are Shumen 2010, Septemvri Simitli and Vidima-Rakovski.

Club Movements Between V Group and the Regional Groups
 North-East: Ariston Ruse, Devnya and Lokomotiv 2008 Kaspichan relegated last season to regional divisions. In July 2013 Kosmos Branichevo was relocated to Shumen and renamed to Shumen 1929. In August 2013 Agroelit Makariopolsko merged with Svetkavitsa. The new teams, coming from the regional divisions, are Botev Novi Pazar, Ticha 1948 Dolni Chiflik, Svetkavitsa and Shumen 1929.
 North-West: Balkan Belogradchik and Lokomotiv 1929 Mezdra relegated from last season to regional divisions. Before the start of the new season Dunav Selanovtsi and Chavdar Troyan withdrew from participation. On 17 July 2013 Botev Debelets was relocated to Veliko Tarnovo and renamed, the new team is called OFC Etar. In August Storgoziya Pleven merged with Spartak Pleven. The new teams, coming from the regional divisions, are Botev Lukovit, OFC Etar, Lokomotiv 2012 Mezdra, Spartak Pleven, Bdin, Yantra Gabrovo, Kom Berkovitsa and Pavlikeni.
 South-East: Hebros Harmanli and Arda Kardzhali relegated from last season to regional divisions. The new teams, coming from the regional divisions, are Minyor Radnevo, FC Eurocollege and Straldzha.
 South-West: Rilski Sportist Samokov and Minyor Bobov Dol relegated from last season to regional divisions. In August 2013 Vitosha Dolna Dikanya was relocated to Pernik and renamed to Minyor Pernik. Before the start of the season Septemvri Simitli decided to withdraw from participation. The new teams, coming from the regional divisions, are Perun Kresna, Minyor Pernik, Vihren Sandanski, Balkan Varvara, Belasitsa Petrich and Sportist Svoge.

North-East V AFG

South-East V AFG

North-West V AFG

South-West V AFG

References

Third Amateur Football League (Bulgaria) seasons
3
Bulgaria